The following is an alphabetical list of articles related to the U.S. state of North Dakota.

0–9 

.nd.us – Internet second-level domain for the state of North Dakota
39th state to join the United States of America

A
Adams County, North Dakota
Adjacent states and provinces:

Agriculture in North Dakota
Airports in North Dakota
Arboreta in North Dakota
commons:Category:Arboreta in North Dakota
Archaeology of North Dakota
:Category:Archaeological sites in North Dakota
commons:Category:Archaeological sites in North Dakota
Architecture of North Dakota
Area codes in North Dakota
Art museums and galleries in North Dakota
commons:Category:Art museums and galleries in North Dakota
Attorney General of the State of North Dakota

B
Barnes County, North Dakota
Battle of Big Mound
Battle of Dead Buffalo Lake
Battle of Grand Coteau (North Dakota)
Battle of Killdeer Mountain
Battle of Stony Lake
Battle of the Badlands
Battle of Whitestone Hill
Benson County, North Dakota
Billings County, North Dakota
Bismarck, capital of the Territory of Dakota 1883-1889 and capital of the State of North Dakota since 1889
Botanical gardens in North Dakota
commons:Category:Botanical gardens in North Dakota
Bottineau County, North Dakota
Bowman County, North Dakota
Buildings and structures in North Dakota
commons:Category:Buildings and structures in North Dakota

 Burke County, North Dakota
 Burleigh County, North Dakota

C

Capital of the State of North Dakota
Capitol of the State of North Dakota
commons:Category:North Dakota State Capitol
Casinos in North Dakota
Cass County, North Dakota
Cavalier County, North Dakota
Census statistical areas of North Dakota
Cities in North Dakota
commons:Category:Cities in North Dakota
Climate of North Dakota
:Category:Climate of North Dakota
commons:Category:Climate of North Dakota
Coat of Arms of the State of North Dakota
Colleges and universities in North Dakota
commons:Category:Universities and colleges in North Dakota
Communications in North Dakota
commons:Category:Communications in North Dakota
Companies in North Dakota
:Category:Companies based in North Dakota
Congressional districts of North Dakota
Constitution of the State of North Dakota
Convention centers in North Dakota
commons:Category:Convention centers in North Dakota
Counties of the State of North Dakota
commons:Category:Counties in North Dakota
Cuisine of North Dakota
Culture of North Dakota
:Category:North Dakota culture
commons:Category:North Dakota culture

D
Demographics of North Dakota
Dickey County, North Dakota
Divide County, North Dakota
Dunn County, North Dakota

E
Economy of North Dakota
:Category:Economy of North Dakota
commons:Category:Economy of North Dakota
Eddy County, North Dakota
Education in North Dakota
:Category:Education in North Dakota
commons:Category:Education in North Dakota
Elections in the State of North Dakota
commons:Category:North Dakota elections
Emmons County, North Dakota
Environment of North Dakota
commons:Category:Environment of North Dakota

F

Fargo, North Dakota
Festivals in North Dakota
commons:Category:Festivals in North Dakota
Flag of the State of North Dakota
Forts in North Dakota
:Category:Forts in North Dakota
commons:Category:Forts in North Dakota

 Foster County, North Dakota

G

Geography of North Dakota
:Category:Geography of North Dakota
commons:Category:Geography of North Dakota
Geology of North Dakota
commons:Category:Geology of North Dakota
Ghost towns in North Dakota
:Category:Ghost towns in North Dakota
commons:Category:Ghost towns in North Dakota
Golden Valley County, North Dakota
Golf clubs and courses in North Dakota
Government of the State of North Dakota  website
:Category:Government of North Dakota
commons:Category:Government of North Dakota
Governor of the State of North Dakota
List of governors of North Dakota
Grand Forks County, North Dakota
Grant County, North Dakota
Great Seal of the State of North Dakota
Griggs County, North Dakota

H
Hettinger County, North Dakota
High schools of North Dakota
Higher education in North Dakota
Highway Patrol of North Dakota
Highway routes in North Dakota
Hiking trails in North Dakota
commons:Category:Hiking trails in North Dakota
History of North Dakota
Historical outline of North Dakota
Hospitals in North Dakota
House of Representatives of the State of North Dakota

I
Images of North Dakota
commons:Category:North Dakota

J

K

 Kidder County, North Dakota

L
Lakes of North Dakota
commons:Category:Lakes of North Dakota
LaMoure County, North Dakota
Landmarks in North Dakota
commons:Category:Landmarks in North Dakota
LGBT history in North Dakota
Lieutenant Governor of the State of North Dakota
Lists related to the State of North Dakota:
List of airports in North Dakota
List of cemeteries in North Dakota
List of census statistical areas in North Dakota
List of cities in North Dakota
List of colleges and universities in North Dakota
List of companies in North Dakota
List of United States congressional districts in North Dakota
List of counties in North Dakota
List of dams and reservoirs in North Dakota
List of forts in North Dakota
List of ghost towns in North Dakota
List of governors of North Dakota
List of high schools in North Dakota
List of highway routes in North Dakota
List of hospitals in North Dakota
List of lakes in North Dakota
List of law enforcement agencies in North Dakota
List of lieutenant governors of North Dakota
List of museums in North Dakota
List of National Historic Landmarks in North Dakota
List of newspapers in North Dakota
List of people from North Dakota
List of power stations in North Dakota
List of radio stations in North Dakota
List of railroads in North Dakota
List of Registered Historic Places in North Dakota
List of rivers of North Dakota
List of school districts in North Dakota
List of state parks in North Dakota
List of state prisons in North Dakota
List of symbols of the State of North Dakota
List of telephone area codes in North Dakota
List of television stations in North Dakota
List of United States congressional delegations from North Dakota
List of United States congressional districts in North Dakota
List of United States representatives from North Dakota
List of United States senators from North Dakota

 Logan County, North Dakota
 Louisiana Purchase of 1803

M
Maps of North Dakota
commons:Category:Maps of North Dakota
Mass media in North Dakota
McHenry County, North Dakota
McIntosh County, North Dakota
McKenzie County, North Dakota
McLean County, North Dakota
Mercer County, North Dakota
Missouri River
Morton County, North Dakota
Mountains of North Dakota
commons:Category:Mountains of North Dakota
Mountrail County, North Dakota
Museums in North Dakota
:Category:Museums in North Dakota
commons:Category:Museums in North Dakota
Music of North Dakota
commons:Category:Music of North Dakota
:Category:Musical groups from North Dakota
:Category:Musicians from North Dakota

N
Natural gas pipelines North Dakota
Natural history of North Dakota
commons:Category:Natural history of North Dakota
ND – United States Postal Service postal code for the State of North Dakota
Nelson County, North Dakota
Newspapers of North Dakota
North Dakota  website
:Category:North Dakota
commons:Category:North Dakota
commons:Category:Maps of North Dakota
North Dakota Association of Counties
North Dakota Highway Patrol
North Dakota pottery
North Dakota Royal Rangers
North Dakota State Capitol
North Dakota State University Press
North Dakota Workforce Safety and Insurance

O
Oil pipelines North Dakota
 Oliver County, North Dakota

P
Pembina County, North Dakota
People from North Dakota
:Category:People from North Dakota
commons:Category:People from North Dakota
:Category:People by city in North Dakota
:Category:People by county in North Dakota
:Category:People from North Dakota by occupation
Pierce County, North Dakota
Politics of North Dakota
:Category:Politics of North Dakota
commons:Category:Politics of North Dakota
Protected areas of North Dakota
commons:Category:Protected areas of North Dakota

Q

R
Radio stations in North Dakota
Railroads in North Dakota
Ramsey County, North Dakota
Ransom County, North Dakota
Registered historic places in North Dakota
commons:Category:Registered Historic Places in North Dakota
Renville County, North Dakota
Religion in North Dakota
:Category:Religion in North Dakota
commons:Category:Religion in North Dakota
Richland County, North Dakota
Rivers of North Dakota
Missouri River
Red River of the North
commons:Category:Rivers of North Dakota

 Rolette County, North Dakota

S
Sam McQuade Sr. softball tournament
Sargent County, North Dakota
School districts of North Dakota
Scouting in North Dakota
Secretary of the State of North Dakota
Senate of the State of North Dakota
Settlements in North Dakota
Cities in North Dakota
Townships in North Dakota
Census Designated Places in North Dakota
Other unincorporated communities in North Dakota
List of ghost towns in North Dakota
Sheridan County, North Dakota
Sioux County, North Dakota
Ski areas and resorts in North Dakota
commons:Category:Ski areas and resorts in North Dakota
Slope County, North Dakota
Solar power in North Dakota
South East Multi-County Agency Narcotics Task Force (North Dakota)
Sports in North Dakota
commons:Category:Sports in North Dakota
Sports venues in North Dakota
commons:Category:Sports venues in North Dakota
SS Flickertail State
Stark County, North Dakota
State Capitol of North Dakota
State of North Dakota  website
Constitution of the State of North Dakota
Government of the State of North Dakota
:Category:Government of North Dakota
commons:Category:Government of North Dakota
Executive branch of the government of the State of North Dakota
Governor of the State of North Dakota
Legislative branch of the government of the State of North Dakota
Legislature of the State of North Dakota
Senate of the State of North Dakota
House of Representatives of the State of North Dakota
Judicial branch of the government of the State of North Dakota
Supreme Court of the State of North Dakota
State parks of North Dakota
commons:Category:State parks of North Dakota
State police of North Dakota
State prisons of North Dakota
Steele County, North Dakota
Structures in North Dakota
commons:Category:Buildings and structures in North Dakota*Supreme Court of the State of North Dakota
Stutsman County, North Dakota
Symbols of the State of North Dakota
:Category:Symbols of North Dakota
commons:Category:Symbols of North Dakota

T
Telecommunications in North Dakota
commons:Category:Communications in North Dakota
Telephone area codes in North Dakota
Television stations in North Dakota
Territory of Dakota, 1861–1889
Territory of Iowa, 1838–1846
Territory of Louisiana, 1805–1812
Territory of Michigan, 1805-(1834–1836)-1837
Territory of Minnesota, 1849–1858
Territory of Missouri, 1812–1821
Territory of Nebraska, (1854–1861)-1867
Territory of Wisconsin, 1836-(1838)-1848
Theatres in North Dakota
commons:Category:Theatres in North Dakota
Tourism in North Dakota  website
commons:Category:Tourism in North Dakota
Towner County, North Dakota
Traill County, North Dakota
Transportation in North Dakota
:Category:Transportation in North Dakota
commons:Category:Transport in North Dakota

U
United States of America
States of the United States of America
United States census statistical areas of North Dakota
United States congressional delegations from North Dakota
United States congressional districts in North Dakota
United States Court of Appeals for the Eighth Circuit
United States District Court for the District of North Dakota
United States representatives from North Dakota
United States senators from North Dakota
Universities and colleges in North Dakota
commons:Category:Universities and colleges in North Dakota
US-ND – ISO 3166-2:US region code for the State of North Dakota
USS North Dakota

V

W
Walsh County, North Dakota
Ward County, North Dakota
Wells County, North Dakota
Wikimedia
Wikimedia Commons:Category:North Dakota
commons:Category:Maps of North Dakota
Wikinews:Category:North Dakota
Wikinews:Portal:North Dakota
Wikipedia Category:North Dakota
Wikipedia:WikiProject North Dakota
:Category:WikiProject North Dakota articles
:Category:WikiProject North Dakota participants
 Williams County, North Dakota
 Wind power in North Dakota

X

Y

Z
Zoos in North Dakota
commons:Category:Zoos in North Dakota

See also

Topic overview:
North Dakota
Outline of North Dakota

North Dakota
 
North Dakota